Chen Jiunn-ming (born 30 June 1970 in Changhua) is a Taiwanese football player and manager. As a player, he plays for Taiwan Power Company F.C. and Chinese Taipei national football team as an attacking midfielder. As a manager, he coaches National Pei Men Senior High School football team and is an assistant coach of Chinese Taipei national football team.

Career
Chen started to play football at the age of 10. He joined the school football team when he studied in Guan Yu Elementary School (管嶼國小) in his hometown Changhua. He later attended Fusing Junior High School (福興國中) in 1982 and National Pei Men Senior High School, the then high school football power in southern Taiwan, in 1985. During his three years in Pei Men, the team won 4 champions and 1 runner-up in major domestic competitions.

In 1986, Chen played for the junior Chinese Taipei national team in the 1987 FIFA World Youth Championship qualification of OFC, to which Republic of China (Taiwan) belonged then, in New Zealand. Three years later, again in New Zealand, he made his senior team debut in the 1990 FIFA World Cup qualification. He gradually became an essential member of the national team during the 1990s.

After finishing serving the military service in Lukuang football team, Chen joined the Taiwan Power Company F.C. in 1993. He witnessed and participated in the brilliant years of 10 consecutive first-division champion titles of Taipower during 1994 to 2004.

In 2001, Pei Men Senior High School, his alma mater, started afresh to enroll football-specialized students and invited Chen to join the coaching staff. Under the guidance of Chen and other Pei Men coaches, the team took the league title in the Highschool Football League 2006 season, and he himself received the Best Coach award as well. Besides coaching in Pei Men, Chen did not end his playing career in Taipower and even won the Golden Shoe award in the 2002 season of Chinese Taipei National Football League. He has expressed, "My form improved as I trained myself as my players."

In 2005, Chen was appointed assistant to Toshiaki Imai, then manager of Chinese Taipei national team.

Career statistics

Honors
 With Taiwan Power Company F.C.
 Chinese Taipei National Football League
 Champions: 1994, 1995, 1996, 1997, 1998, 1999, 2000–01, 2001–02, 2002–03, 2004, 2007, 2008
 Runners-up: 1993, 2005, 2006
 CTFA Cup
 Champions: 1997, 2000, 2002

 Individual
 Chinese Taipei National Football League MVP: 1994
 Chinese Taipei National Football League Golden Shoe: 1999, 2002

Managerial titles
 With Pei Men
 Highschool Football League
 Champion: 2006

 Individual
 Highschool Football League Best Coach: 2006

References

External links
 俊明世界 - Chen Jiunn-ming's blog

1970 births
Living people
Taiwan Power Company F.C. players
Taiwanese football managers
Taiwanese footballers
People from Changhua County
Association football midfielders